The Pac-12 Conference Men's Soccer Coach of the Year is an annual award given to the best head coach in the Pac-12 Conference during the NCAA Division I men's soccer season. The award has been given since 2000.

Kevin Grimes has won the award five times.

Key

Winners

Coach of the Year (2000–present)

References

NCAA Division I men's soccer conference coaches of the year
Coach of the Year
Awards established in 2000